William J. Behan (1840-1928) was an American Confederate veteran and politician. He served as the 41st mayor of New Orleans (November 20, 1882 – April 28, 1884).

Early life

Behan was born in New Orleans, Louisiana on September 25, 1840 to his Irish immigrant parents, John Holland Behan and Katherine Behan. He was the eldest of three boys, William J., Frank, and Isaac D. With deep family ties to the city, Behan was destined from a young age to live out his days in the area.  William attended the Western Military Institute in Nashville, Tennessee. Behan became Captain of the Mistick Krewe of Comus.

Behan joined the Washington Artillery of the Confederate States Army during the American Civil War of 1861–1865. He held, at the time, the notoriety of being the youngest officer under that section of General Robert E. Lee's forces. He became a major in the CSA.

Career
After the war, Behan headed the implementation of the Crescent City White League.  This paramilitary group consisted of Confederate veterans who sought to keep Republicans from taking office. It was described by many to be the "Military arm of the Democratic Party.

Behan's involvement in the formation of this led to his nomination from the Democratic Party for the Mayor of New Orleans. He won in what is considered a landslide political victory in the 1882 election.  He became the first Mayor in the new city charter which was constructed in the post-war process.  In 1884, after two years in office, Behan lost his incumbent position in what is considered to be an travesty to the Democratic selection.  The popular vote in the election was thrown out and was deemed inconclusive, and the decision was made by a "Ring" of influential politicians. He was then ousted by fellow Democrat J. Valsin Guillotte. Outraged by this decision, Behan left the party and joined the Republicans. In 1904, Behand ran as the Republican candidate for governor of Louisiana, but was thoroughly defeated by Democrat Newton Blanchard. After the defeat, he stated that he would never strive to be Mayor of New Orleans for the rest of his life.

After leaving politics, Behan found riches as a business merchant and a manufacturer of sugar.  He also was a partner in the Zuberbeir and Behan groceries company.

Death
Behan died May 4, 1928 on Jackson Avenue at his home in New Orleans.

References

1840 births
1928 deaths
Mayors of New Orleans
Confederate States Army officers